Antonios or Anthony Kounadis (born 20 April 1937 in Athens) is a discus thrower, civil engineer, scholar and academician from Greece. He was President of the Academy of Athens for the year 2018. He was named the 1959 Greek Athlete of the Year.

Sport career 
He represented his native country at the 1960 Summer Olympics in Rome, Italy, where he ended up in 18th place in the overall-rankings. Kounadis is best known for having won the gold medal in the men's discus event at the 1959 Summer Universiade and at the 1959 Mediterranean Games.

Academic career 
A professor of civil engineering at the National Technical University of Athens (NTUA), he was elected in 1999 a full member of the Academy of Athens. He was Vice-President of the Academy of Athens for the year 2017, and President for the year 2018.

Sources 
 

1937 births
Living people
Greek male discus throwers
Athletes (track and field) at the 1960 Summer Olympics
Olympic athletes of Greece
Universiade medalists in athletics (track and field)
Athletes from Athens
Mediterranean Games gold medalists for Greece
Mediterranean Games medalists in athletics
Athletes (track and field) at the 1959 Mediterranean Games
Universiade gold medalists for Greece
Members of the Academy of Athens (modern)
Members of Academia Europaea
Members of the Serbian Academy of Sciences and Arts
Members of the European Academy of Sciences and Arts
National Technical University of Athens alumni
Academic staff of the National Technical University of Athens
Brown University faculty
Georgia Tech faculty
Academic staff of the Delft University of Technology
Academic staff of the University of Hamburg
California Institute of Technology faculty
Grand Crosses of the Order of the Phoenix (Greece)
Grand Commanders of the Order of George I
Grand Commanders of the Order of Honour (Greece)
Greek engineers
Medalists at the 1959 Summer Universiade